Leslie McGregor "Leee" John (born 23 June 1957) is a British musician, singer, and actor of St Lucian descent. He was born in Hackney, London, and educated in New York City, later studying drama at the Anna Scher Theatre School. He is perhaps best known as the lead singer of the soul band Imagination, which had three UK top 10 hits in the early 1980s.

Career

He was working as a backing singer when he met Ashley Ingram (born 27 November 1957, Northampton, England) a guitarist/bassist. They formed a songwriting partnership, working in a short-lived band called Fizzz. Together with Ingram and Errol Kennedy (born 9 June 1953, Montego Bay, Jamaica) they formed Imagination, a three-piece soul music band, in the early 1980s. Produced by Jolley & Swain, their hit "Body Talk" reached number 4 in the UK Singles Chart in May 1981.  Their biggest hit, "Just an Illusion", peaked at number 2 in March 1982. The trio frequently appeared on Top of the Pops and other pop music programmes.

Despite not being an actor, Leee John made a guest appearance on Doctor Who in the story "Enlightenment" in 1983, playing the character Mansell; he replaced actor David Rhule, who had dropped out at short notice due to an industrial strike at the BBC after the rehearsals had begun. The group's fortunes waned but they continued to perform, tour and record until the early 1990s.  John went back to acting, but in 2003 resurfaced in the reality television show Reborn in the USA, alongside other singers such as Elkie Brooks and Tony Hadley. He appeared on The Adam and Joe Show, in the series four segment "The 1980s House", a spoof of the popular reality series putting families into homes with period features, with Leee playing the house designer.

He released a number of dance singles in the late 1990s and early 2000s, including the UK garage and house tracks "Your Mind, Your Body, Your Soul" on Locked On Records and "U Turn Me" with Ten City vocalist Byron Stingily (2000). Under the artist name Johnny X, he also co-wrote and performed vocals on "Call on Me" which was released on Higher State. In 2005, John released a jazz album, Feel My Soul, on Candid Records, featuring a mixture of jazz standards and original compositions. Since the album's release, John has been touring the UK and Europe with his jazz quartet, as well as performing with Imagination. In 2007, he submitted the track "Trust My Heart" for Ian Levine's album Northern Soul 2007.

John is an Ambassador for SOS Children's Villages, an international orphan charity providing homes and mothers for orphaned and abandoned children. He currently supports the charity's annual World Orphan Week campaign which takes place each February. In 2012, John performed at the Leicester Square Theatre. Special guests included Mike Lindup from Level 42.

John appeared on the track "The Lost Chord" by Gorillaz for their Song Machine project, which was followed by the album Song Machine, Season One: Strange Timez.

In 2022 he participated in the "Disco Diva" Festival of the Disco Music (https://discodiva.it/) which is held every year to Gabicce Monte with the artistic direction of the journalist Cristina Tassinari.

Feel My Soul (2005)
Live in Paris at the New Morning (2007)
The Voice of Illusion Vol. 1 (2008)
Now Is the Time (2008)

References

Bibliography

External links
 
 Official website
 Discography from Leee John's personal website

1957 births
Alumni of the Anna Scher Theatre School
20th-century Black British male singers
English male television actors
English songwriters
Living people
People from Hackney Central
English people of Saint Lucian descent
British male songwriters
Locked On Records artists